Liana Fiol Matta (born October 20, 1946) is a Puerto Rican jurist and formerly the 16th chief justice of the Supreme Court of Puerto Rico. Fiol was born in Rio Piedras, Puerto Rico and is the second woman in Puerto Rican history to serve in the highest court of the island as well as being the second woman to hold the post of chief justice.

Biography

Fiol received her law degree from the University of Puerto Rico, magna cum laude, and later her master's and doctorate degree from Columbia University. She was a law professor in Puerto Rico during the 1980s until she was appointed Judge of the Court of Appeals of Puerto Rico by Governor Rafael Hernández Colón. She held that seat until 2003, when Governor Sila Calderón appointed her to associated justice for the Puerto Rico Supreme Court. She was confirmed by the Senate and began her duties on February, 2004. At present besides being an Associate Justice of the Puerto Rico Supreme Court, she is a tenured professor at the University of Puerto Rico School of Law. On April 11, 2014, Fiol Matta became the 16th chief justice of the Supreme Court of Puerto Rico, after being nominated by Governor Alejandro García Padilla, thus succeeding Federico Hernández Denton as court chief justice. Served as chief justice until her retirement on February 1, 2016.

Justice Fiol Matta was perceived as the leading liberal voice in the Puerto Rican high court.

Notes

External links
 Supreme Court of Puerto Rico: "Conservative and Slow" (Conservador y lento) - Primera Hora; Oscar J. Serrano; April 2, 2007

1946 births
Associate Justices of the Supreme Court of Puerto Rico
Chief Justices of the Supreme Court of Puerto Rico
Columbia University alumni
Living people
People from Río Piedras, Puerto Rico
Trinity Washington University alumni
University of Puerto Rico alumni
Women chief justices